The Ministry of Commerce and Industry, or Ministry of Trade and Industry, is a type of department in many governments.

Ministry of Commerce and Industry may also refer to:

 Ministry of Commerce and Industry (Haiti)
 Ministry of Commerce and Industry (India)
 Ministry of Commerce and Industry (Japan)
 Ministry of Commerce and Industry (Kuwait)
 Ministry of Commerce and Industry (Oman)

See also
 Minister of Commerce and Industry (disambiguation)
 Commerce minister
 Industry minister